American singer and rapper Lizzo has released four studio albums, two mixtapes, two extended plays, 23 singles, and three promotional singles. Before signing with Atlantic Records, she released two studio albums—Lizzobangers in 2013 and Big Grrrl Small World in 2015. In 2014, Time named her one of 14 music artists to watch. Her first major-label extended play, Coconut Oil, was released in 2016.

After struggling with body issues from an early age, Lizzo became an advocate for body positivity and self-love, and, in 2019, she achieved breakthrough success with her third studio album, Cuz I Love You. That year, after being featured in Netflix film Someone Great, her 2017 single "Truth Hurts" became a viral sleeper hit, reaching number one on the Billboard Hot 100 two years after its initial release. The song stayed atop the chart for seven weeks and has been certified seven-times Platinum by the Recording Industry Association of America. Lizzo's 2016 song "Good as Hell" was subsequently rereleased as well as a remix version of the song featuring American singer Ariana Grande. The single reached number three on the Hot 100 and has been certified four-times Platinum by the Recording Industry Association of America.

Albums

Studio albums

Mixtapes

Extended plays

Singles

As lead artist

As featured artist

Promotional singles

Other charted and certified songs

Music videos

Guest appearances

Songwriting credits

Notes

References

Discographies of American artists
Hip hop discographies
Rhythm and blues discographies